Alberta Rose Theatre, formerly known as the Alameda Cinema, is an historic theatre in Portland, Oregon's Concordia neighborhood, in the United States.

See also
 Alberta Arts District

References

External links
 
 

Concordia, Portland, Oregon
Theatres in Portland, Oregon